René Christensen may refer to:

 René Christensen (footballer) (born 1988), Danish footballer
 René Christensen (politician) (born 1970), Danish politician and MF